Peter Hraško (born November 6, 1991) is a Slovak professional ice hockey defenceman who is currently playing for HKM Zvolen of the Slovak Extraliga.

Career statistics

Regular season and playoffs

International

Awards and honors

References

External links

1991 births
Living people
HC 07 Detva players
HC Slavia Praha players
HKM Zvolen players
Slovak ice hockey defencemen
Slovak expatriate ice hockey players in the Czech Republic
Expatriate ice hockey players in Kazakhstan
Slovak expatriate sportspeople in Kazakhstan